This is a list of the U.S. Billboard magazine Hot 100 number-ones of 1990. The three longest running number-one singles of 1990 are "Nothing Compares 2 U" by Sinéad O'Connor, "Vision of Love" by Mariah Carey, and "Because I Love You (The Postman Song)" by Stevie B, which
each attained four weeks at the top of the chart.

That year, 15 acts earned their first number one song, such as Michael Bolton, The Wild Pair, Alannah Myles, Taylor Dayne, Tommy Page, Sinéad O'Connor, Wilson Phillips, Glenn Medeiros, Mariah Carey, Sweet Sensation, Nelson, Maxi Priest, Vanilla Ice, and Stevie B. Jon Bon Jovi, already having hit number one with Bon Jovi, also earns his first number one song as a solo act. Janet Jackson, Wilson Phillips, and Mariah Carey were the only acts to hit number one more than once, with each of them hitting twice.

Chart history

Number-one artists

See also
1990 in music
List of Billboard number-one singles

References

Additional sources
Fred Bronson's Billboard Book of Number 1 Hits, 5th Edition
Joel Whitburn's Top Pop Singles 1955-2008, 12 Edition
Joel Whitburn Presents the Billboard Hot 100 Charts: The Nineties
Additional information obtained can be verified within Billboard's online archive services and print editions of the magazine.

United States Hot 100
1990